Iceland competed at the Deaflympics for the first time in 1993 and also bagged their first medal at the Deaflympics, which is also Iceland's only medal in Deaflympics history. Iceland also competed in the 1997, 2005 and 2013 Deaflympic events.

Iceland is yet to compete at the Winter Deaflympics.

Medal tallies

Summer Deaflympics

See also 
 Iceland at the Olympics
 Iceland at the Paralympics

References 

Nations at the Deaflympics
Iceland at multi-sport events
Deaf culture in Iceland